The York Hotel is a heritage hotel on Hannan Street, in Kalgoorlie, Western Australia.

Location
The hotel is located at 259 Hannan Street,  between Wilson and Cassidy Streets.

History
The hotel was built by John Crothers in 1900–1901 for landlord and proprietor, Henry Edward Laslett. It was designed as a two-storey building in the Federation Anglo-Dutch style by architect Daniel T Edmunds, who also designed the City Markets, another historic landmark building in Kalgoorlie. The foundation stone was laid on 5 September 1900.

The hotel opened on 23 February 1901. It was leased to Peter McLachlan, who had previously served as the manager of McPhair's Hotel on Collins Street in Melbourne. The facade was renovated in 1974 and 1985. 

It still serves as a hotel and a restaurant.

Photographs
The hotel is one of the more photographed buildings in Kalgoorlie due to its design.

Heritage value
The hotel was classified by the National Trust of Australia (WA) on 7 May 1977. It was also entered onto the Register of the National Estate by the Australian Heritage Commission on 21 October 1980. Additionally, it has been listed on the State Heritage Register since 9 February 1996.

In 1992 Australia Post featured the York Hotel on a postage stamp as part of the Desert Gold set of four stamps commemorating the discovery of gold in Western Australia.

Gallery

References

External links

1901 establishments in Australia
Hotel buildings completed in 1901
Hotels established in 1901
Federation style architecture
Heritage hotels in Australia
Western Australian places listed on the defunct Register of the National Estate
Art Nouveau architecture in Australia
Art Nouveau hotels
Hotels in Kalgoorlie-Boulder
State Register of Heritage Places in the City of Kalgoorlie-Boulder
Heritage places in Kalgoorlie, Western Australia